The third series of the children's British cooking programme Matilda and the Ramsay Bunch which began airing from 5 May 2017 on CBBC, the series consists of 15 episodes. The series concluded on 11 August 2017. It was announced in July 2016 that CBBC had renewed the series for a third series witch will air in 2017. The third series will follow the same format as the past two series where we will see the Ramsay family on their summer holidays in L.A, all of the Ramsay family will return for the third series.

It was announced in June 2017, that a fourth series has been ordered to air in summer 2018.

Production

Development
After the second series of Matilda and the Ramsay Bunch had finished airing, it was later announced due to the popularity of the first two series that there would be a third series to air in 2017. It was officially announced on 19 July 2016 that CBBC had ordered a third series of Matilda and the Ramsay Bunch, the third series is due to start in early 2017 on the CBBC channel. The series will be made up of 15x15 minute episodes.

The third series will carry on airing on Fridays same as series two, however, the series has been moved to an earlier time slot and will air at 7:45 am making it earlier than past series which have all aired between 4 pm and 5:30 pm.

Filming
Filming for the third series was the same as past series, it took place during the U.K summer holidays when the Ramsay family go to L.A for their holidays. All the Ramsay family will return for the third series. The third series finished filming in L.A on 23 August 2016, with more filming talking place in the U.K.

Promotion
The third series of Matilda and the Ramsay Bunch is due to begin airing on 5 May 2017 on CBBC, the first preview clip was posted on 29 April 2017 on the CBBC website. The clip was from the first episode, the official trailer for the third series was also released on 29 April and was shown on CBBC and on the CBBC official YouTube channel.

Matilda Ramsay went on to ITV This Morning to promote the new series and to also promote her new cooking book based on the third series.

Guest starring
The third series also had guest appearances from celebrities same as the second series.

Episodes

Ratings

References

External links
 
 

2017 British television seasons